The 2014–15 Borussia Mönchengladbach season was the 114th season in the club's football history. In the previous season, Borussia finished in fifth place and thus qualified for the UEFA Europa League Play-off Round. In the Bundesliga, it was the club's seventh consecutive season, having been promoted from the 2. Bundesliga in 2008.

Players

Squad
As of 6 July 2014

Transfers

In

Out

Season overview

August

In the first round draw of the DFB-Pokal, Mönchengladbach were drawn against FC 08 Homburg. The match took place on 16 August. Mönchengladbach got two goals from Branimir Hrgota and an extra goal from André Hahn. Hahn gave Mönchengladbach a 1–0 lead before Marc Gallego for Homburg equalized in the 20th minute. Then Hrgota scored in the 45th and 51st minutes to give Mönchengladbach a 3–1 lead.

In Borussia Mönchengladbach's opening match of the Bundesliga campaign, on matchday 1, on 24 August, resulted in a 1–1 draw against VfB Stuttgart. Christoph Kramer scored for Mönchengladbach and Alexandru Maxim scored for Stuttgart. Maxim gave Stuttgart the lead in the 51st minute than Kramer equalized in the 90th minute. Mönchengladbach finished the matchday in 10th place.

On matchday 2, on 31 August, Mönchengladbach and SC Freiburg finished their match in a 0–0 draw. There were three yellow cards handed out in the match. Mönchengladbach finished the matchday in 11th place.

September

On matchday 3, on 13 September, Mönchengladbach defeated Schalke 04 4–1. Mönchengladbach got two goals from André Hahn and a goal each from Max Kruse, Raffael and Eric Maxim Choupo-Moting scored for Schalke. Hahn gave Mönchengladbach a 2–0 lead when he scored his two goals in the 17th and 50th minutes. Chuopo-Moting pulled Schalke a goal back in the 52nd minute before Kruse restored the two-goal lead in the 56th minute. Raffael put Mönchengladbach up 4–1 in the 79th minute. Mönchengladbach finished the matchday in sixth place.

The match between Mönchengladbach and 1. FC Köln, on matchday 4, on 21 September, finished in a 0–0 draw. Mönchengladbach finished the mathday in Seventh place.

Then on matchday 5, on 24 September, Mönchengladbach defeated Hamburger SV 1–0 with a 24th-minute goal from Max Kruse. Mönchengladbach finished the matchday in sixth place.

Then on matchday 6, on 27 September, Mönchengladbach defeated SC Paderborn 2–1. Patrick Herrmann and Raffael scored for Mönchengladbach and Jens Wemmer scored for Paderborn. Herrmann scored in the eighth minute and Raffael scored in the 14th minute to give Mönchengladbach a 2–0 lead. Wemmer pulled Paderborn a goal back in the 70th minute. Mönchengladbach finished the matchday in second place.

October

The match between Mönchengladbach and Mainz 05 on matchday 7, on 5 October, finished in a 1–1 draw. Max Kruse scored for Mönchengladbach and Jonas Hofmann scored for Mainz. Kruse gave Mönchengladbach a 1–0 lead in the 15th minute before Hofmann equalized from a penalty shot in the 31st minute. Mönchengladbach finished the matchday in third place.

On matchday 8, on 18 October, Mönchengladbach defeated Hannover 96 3–0 with two goals from Max Kruse and a goal from Granit Xhaka. Kruse scored his first goal in the 14th minute, then Xhaka made it 2–0 in the 49th minute, Kruse got his second goal in the 90th minute. Mönchengladbach finished the matchday in second place.

The match between Mönchengladbach and Bayern Munich, on matchday 9, on 26 October, finished in a 0–0 draw. Mönchengladbach finished the matchday in second place.

In the second round of the DFB-Pokal, Mönchengladbach were drawn against Eintracht Frankfurt. The match took place on 29 October. Mönchengladbach won 2–1. Thorgan Hazard and Ibrahima Traoré scored for Mönchengladbach and Václav Kadlec scored for Frankfurt. Hazard scored in the 17th minute and Traoré scored in the 67th minute to put Mönchengladbach up 2–0. Kadlec pulled one back in the 89th minute.

November

On matchday 10, on 2 November, Mönchengladbach defeated 1899 Hoffenheim 3–1. Mönchengladbach got two goals from Patrick Herrmann and a goal from André Hahn. Anthony Modeste scored for Hoffenheim. Hahn scored in the 12th minute to give Mönchengladbach the lead. Then Modeste equalized in the 30th minute. Mönchengladbach reclaimed the lead when  Herrmann scored two minutes later. He got his second goal of the match in the 52nd minute. Mönchengladbach finished the matchday in third place.

December

January

February

March

In the round 3 draw of the DFB-Pokal, Mönchengladbach were drawn against Kickers Offenbach. The match took place on 4 March. Mönchengladbach won 2–0 with goals from Max Kruse and Patrick Herrmann. Kruse scored in the 52nd minute from a penalty shot and Herrmann scored in the 83rd minute.

The match on matchday 24, on 7 March, between Mönchengladbach and 1. FSV Mainz 05 finished in a 2–2 draw. Mönchengladbach took a 2–0 lead when Raffael scored in the 27th and 67th minutes. However, Mainz came back to score two goals from Johannes Geis and Shinji Okazaki. Mönchengladbach finished the matchday in third place.

On matchday 25, on 15 March, Mönchengladbach defeated Hannover 95 2–0 with two goals from Patrick Herrmann. Herrmann scored in the 43rd and 75th minutes. Mönchengladbach finished the matchday in third place.

On matchday 26, on 22 March, Mönchengladbach defeated Bayern 2–0 with two goals by Raffael. Raffael scored in the 30th and 77th minutes. Mönchengladbach finished the matchday in third place.

April

In the quarter-final draw of the DFB-Pokal, Mönchengladbach were drawn against Arminia Bielefeld. The match took place on 9 April. The match drew at 1–1, and after extra time, went into penalties. Mönchengladbach lost 4–5 on penalties.

Competitions

Bundesliga

League table

Results summary

Results by round

Matches

DFB-Pokal

UEFA Europa League

Play-off round

Group stage

Knockout phase

Round of 32

Statistics

Appearances and goals

|-
! colspan=12 style=background:#dcdcdc; text-align:center| Goalkeepers

|-
! colspan=12 style=background:#dcdcdc; text-align:center| Defenders

|-
! colspan=12 style=background:#dcdcdc; text-align:center| Midfielders

|-
! colspan=12 style=background:#dcdcdc; text-align:center| Forwards

Goalscorers
This includes all competitive matches.  The list is sorted by shirt number when total goals are equal.

Last updated: 30 May 2015

Disciplinary record
Includes all competitive matches. The list is sorted by shirt number when total cards are equal.

 Last updated on 25 September 2014

References

Borussia Mönchengladbach seasons
Borussia Monchengladbach
Borussia Mönchengladbach